Amorpha californica is a species of flowering plant in the legume family known by the common name California false indigo.

It is native to California, Arizona, and northern Baja California, where it grows in the California chaparral and woodlands and other chaparral and oak woodlands habitats. It is generally considered an understory plant.

Description
Amorpha californica is a glandular, thorn-less shrub with leaves made up of spiny, oval-shaped leaflets each tipped with a resin gland. The scattered inflorescences are spike-like racemes of flowers, each flower with a single violet petal and ten protruding stamens. The fruit is a legume pod containing usually a single seed.

Subspecies 
The standard variety is Amorpha californica var. californica. Amorpha california var. napensis is a rare plant; it only grows around San Francisco and in the North Coast Ranges.

Butterflies
The endemic California dogface butterfly larvae feed on Amorpha californica, along with the Southern dogface and the silver-spotted skipper.

See also 

 Amorpha fruticosa

References

External links
Jepson Manual Treatment - Amorpha californica
USDA Plants Profile: Amorpha californica

Amorpha californica - U.C. Photo gallery

 The complete chloroplast genome of the threatened Napa False Indigo Amorpha californica var. napensis Jeps. 1925 (Fabaceae) from Northern California, USA
 Wilbur, Robert L. “A REVISION OF THE NORTH AMERICAN GENUS AMORPHA (LEGUMINOSAE-PSORALEAE).” Rhodora, vol. 77, no. 811, 1975, pp. 337–409. JSTOR, http://www.jstor.org/stable/23311397. Accessed 1 Sep. 2022.

californica
Flora of California
Flora of Arizona
Flora of Baja California
Flora of the Sierra Nevada (United States)
Natural history of the California Coast Ranges
Natural history of the Santa Monica Mountains
Butterfly food plants
Plants described in 1838